Büğet can refer to:

 Büğet, Çorum
 Büğet, Eskil